The National Cooperative Research and Production Act (NCRPA, P.L. 103-42) is a United States federal law that reduces potential antitrust liabilities of research joint ventures (RJV) and standards development organizations (SDOs).

The NCRPA replaced the earlier National Cooperative Research Act of 1984 (P.L. 98-462)

United States federal antitrust legislation